At the Cafe Bohemia, Vol. 1 is a live album by the Jazz Messengers for Blue Note Records. It featured the original incarnation of the Jazz Messengers, Art Blakey's career-spanning band, and is the first of two volumes recorded on November 23, 1955, at Café Bohemia, a famous night club in Greenwich Village in New York.

With the July 31, 2001, CD re-issue, three additional tracks from this night were added: "Lady Bird", "Deciphering the Message", and "What's New?".

Reception

This album, which sees the first version of The Jazz Messengers on record, was noted as not "match[ing] the intensity which the quintet secured at Birdland." Tenor saxophonist Hank Mobley, in particular, is noted as "a somewhat unfocused stylist." However, trumpeter Kenny Dorham is seen as an "elusive brilliance [that] was seldom so extensively captured" and the playing in general "is just as absorbing" as the Birdland albums and is "still timeless music."

Track listing
 Announcement by Art Blakey 1:32
 "Soft Winds" 12:34
 "The Theme" 6:11
 "Minor's Holiday" 9:11
 "Alone Together" 4:15
 "Prince Albert" 8:51
 "Lady Bird" (reissue bonus track) 7:30
 "What's New?" (reissue bonus track) 4:31
 "Deciphering the Message" (reissue bonus track) 10:13

Personnel
Art Blakey — drums
Kenny Dorham — trumpet
Hank Mobley — tenor saxophone
Horace Silver — piano
Doug Watkins — bass

Production
Bob Bluementhal, Leonard Feather — liner notes
Michael Cuscuna — reissue producer
John Hermansader — cover design
Alfred Lion — producer
Rudy Van Gelder — digital remastering
Francis Wolff — photography

References

Albums produced by Alfred Lion
Albums produced by Michael Cuscuna
Art Blakey live albums
The Jazz Messengers live albums
1956 live albums
Blue Note Records live albums
Albums recorded at the Café Bohemia